Neal Roese (born February 13, 1965) holds the SC Johnson Chair in Global Marketing at the Kellogg School of Management at Northwestern University. Trained as a social psychologist, he is most well known for his work on judgment and decision making, counterfactual thinking, and regret.

Biography
Neal Roese grew up in Vancouver, Winnipeg and Calgary, Canada. He received his B.Sc. in 1987 from the University of British Columbia, his MA in 1990 from the University of Manitoba, and his Ph.D. in 1993 from the University of Western Ontario with the dissertation "The functional basis of counterfactual thinking". After a Postdoctoral Fellowship at the University of California, Santa Barbara, 1993–1994, he was appointed assistant professor, Northwestern University, 1994–2000, Associate Professor and Canada Research Chair in Social Psychology, Simon Fraser University, Canada, 2000–2002, Associate Professor and then Professor at the University of Illinois at Urbana-Champaign. He was an Associate at the Center for Advanced Study, University of Illinois, 2008–2009. Dr. Roese returned to Northwestern University as Professor of Marketing in 2009, with a joint appointment in the Department of Psychology.     In his current position, he teaches MBA and PhD courses centering on consumer choice.

Academic work
Neal Roese has published scholarly articles on topics including memory biases, emotion, and legal decision making. He is the author of the 2005 book, If Only,  which focused on the experience of regret in daily life. According to WorldCat, the book is held in 289 libraries  He edited, with James M. Olson, the 1995 book  What might have been: The social psychology of counterfactual thinking. ( Mahwah, NJ: Erlbaum). According to WorldCat, the book is held in 423 libraries 
  
His work has been profiled in such outlets as Business Insider, CBS News, NPR, New York Times, Los Angeles Times, Chicago Tribune, and the Harvard Business Review.

His research on Counterfactual thinking has shown that counterfactual thoughts and regret can be beneficial in that they feed into learning from experience.  Certain kinds of 
counterfactuals and regrets connect specifically to distinct motivational states, such as orientations toward either promotion or prevention.

His research on regret has covered several topics, ranging from decision consequences of regret to the mental health implications of major life regrets. In the latter case, his research on life regrets show that when adults look back on their lives, they are most likely to regret facets of love and work, i.e., personal relationships and career accomplishment.

He also was contributed to the theoretical understanding of "hindsight bias," defined as the tendency to see the past as more predictable than it was in foresight. As such, hindsight bias is a potent and widely studied cognitive trap for many decision makers. In 2012, he published a comprehensive review and theoretical reformulation of the scholarly literature on hindsight bias, spanning the disciplines of psychology, law, medicine, economics, political science, and history.  In earlier research, he showed that cognitive processes that serve to explain, clarify, and elaborate on events contribute to hindsight bias.  In fact, visualization tools that help to manage big data sets may paradoxically increase hindsight bias by contributing to an illusion of clarity.

See also
 Counterfactual thinking
 Positive illusions
 Disconfirmed expectancy

References

External links
Official website at Northwestern University
 Dr. Roese's List of Academic Publications
 Business Insider's Report on Dr. Roese's research

Living people
1965 births
Canadian psychologists
University of British Columbia alumni
University of Manitoba alumni
University of Western Ontario alumni
Northwestern University faculty